This is a list of notable French scientists.

A–F

 José Achache, geophysicist and ecologist
 Jean le Rond d'Alembert, mathematician, mechanician, physicist and philosopher
 Claude Allègre, geochemist
 Lucile Allorge, botanist
 André-Marie Ampère, physicist and mathematician
 Françoise Ardré, phycologist, marine scientist
 Louis Bachelier, mathematician
 Antoine Jérôme Balard, chemist
 Éliane Basse, paleontologist and geologist
 Pierre-Dominique Bazaine, mathematician and engineer
 Jean de Beaurain, geographer
 Antoine César Becquerel, electrochemist
 A.E. Becquerel, physicist
 Henri Becquerel, physicist and Nobel laureate
 Jean Becquerel, physicist
 Léon Bence, physician
 Jacques Benoit (biologist), physician,  biologist and neuroendocrinologist
 Claude Bernard, physiologist
 Marcellin Berthelot, chemist
 Julien Bessières, physician, diplomat, and member of the Commission des Sciences et des Arts
 Jean Bosler, astronomer
 Claude Bourgelat, veterinary surgeon
 Thomas Bourgeron, neuroscientist
 Jean-Baptiste Boussingault, chemist
 Gerard Brachet, space scientist
 Paul Broca, physician, surgeon, anatomist, and anthropologist
 Bernard Brunhes, physicist
 Georges-Louis Leclerc, Comte de Buffon, naturalist and mathematician 
 Bernard Cabane, physicist
 Pierre Jean George Cabanis, physiologist
 Albert Calmette, physician, bacteriologist and immunologist
 Georges Canguilhem, physician and philosopher
 Nicolas Léonard Sadi Carnot, physicist and military engineer
 Henri Cartan, mathematician
 Augustin-Louis Cauchy, mathematician and physicist
 Jean-François Champollion, philologist
 Véronique Chankowski, historian
 Georges Charpak, physicist, Nobel prize winner 1992
 Georges Charpy, physicist and metallurgist
 Albert Châtelet, mathematician
 Émilie du Châtelet, mathematician and physicist
 Jean Mathieu de Chazelles, professor of hydrography
 Michel Che, chemist
 Gustave Choquet, mathematician
 Charles Pierre Claret de Fleurieu, explorer, hydrographer and politician
 Alain Connes, mathematician; Fields Medalist 1982
 Louis Couffignal,  mathematician and cybernetician
 Charles-Augustin de Coulomb, physicist
 Jean Courtial, physician and polytechnician
 Vincent Courtillot,  geophysicist
 Philippe Cousteau, oceanographer
 Jean-Marie-Joseph Coutelle, engineer, scientist and pioneer of ballooning
 Adam de Craponne, engineer who implemented the Canal de Craponne in 1559
 Jean Cruveilhier,  anatomist and pathologist
 Marie Curie, physicist and chemist, two Nobel Prizes, in physics (1903) and chemistry (1911)
 Pierre Curie, physicist and chemist, Nobel Prize in physics (1903)
 Georges Cuvier, regarded as the founding father of palaeontology
 Boris Cyrulnik,  ethologist, neurologist, and psychiatrist
 Thomas-François Dalibard, physicist and botanist
 Henry Darcy, hydraulic engineer
 Michel Darluc, naturalist
 Raymond Daudel, quantum chemist
 Jean Dausset, biologist, Nobel prize winner 1980
 André-Louis Debierne, chemist
 Jean Baptiste Joseph Delambre, mathematician and astronomer
 Marcel Deprez, electrical engineer
 John Theophilus Desaguliers, natural philosopher (physicist)
 Guillaume Delisle, cartographer
 Girard Desargues, mathematician
 René Descartes, scientist and philosopher
 Robert Debré, physician
 Georges Duby, historian
 Jean-Baptiste du Hamel, natural philosopher (physicist)
 Émilien Dumas, paleontologist, and geologist
 Jean-Baptiste Dumas, chemist
 Charles François Dupuis, polymath and theologian
 Pierre Fauchard, dentist
 Hervé Faye, astronomer
 Pierre de Fermat, mathematician
 Louis Feuillée, explorer, astronomer, geographer, and botanist
 Bernard Foing, astronomer
 Pierre Fourmanoir, ichthyologist
 Joseph Fourier, mathematician and physicist
 Augustin-Jean Fresnel, physicist known for work on optics

G–M

 Pierre-Gilles de Gennes, mathematician and physicist
 Paul Gervais, palaeontologist and entomologist
 Jacques Géry, ichthyologist
 Mirko Grmek, historian of medicine
 Camille Guérin, biologist
 Alexander Grothendieck, mathematician; Fields Medalist 1966 (German-born)
 André Guinier, physicist
 Jacques Hadamard, mathematician
 Armand Havet, botanist
 Charles Hermite, mathematician
 François Jacob, biologist, Nobel prize winner 1965
 Charles Janet, chemist and biologist
 Paul Janet, philosopher
 Irène Joliot-Curie, physicist and Nobel Prize winner
 Frédéric Joliot-Curie, physicist, Nobel Prize winner 1935
 Jean Jouzel, glaciologist and climatologist
 Gaston Julia, mathematician
 Étienne Hubert d'Orléans, Arabist
 Nicole El Karoui, mathematician
 Robert Kühner, mycologist
 Michel de La Vigne, physician
 Yves Lacoste, geographer and geopolitician
 Laurent Lafforgue, mathematician; Fields Medalist 2002
 Frédéric de Lafresnaye, ornithologist
 Joseph Louis Lagrange, mathematician
 Jean Laherrère, consultant and petroleum engineer
 Claude François Lallemand, physician and pathologist
 Jean-Baptiste Lamarck, evolutionary biologist
 Paul Langevin, physicist
 Pierre-Simon Laplace, mathematician and physicist
 François-de-Paule Latapie, botanist
 Lucien Laubier, oceanographer
 René Lavocat, paleontologist
 Antoine Lavoisier, chemist
 Xavier Le Pichon,  geophysicist
 Jean-Marie Lehn, chemist, Nobel prize winner in 1987
 Jean-Marc Lévy-Leblond, physicist
 Claude Lévi-Strauss, anthropologist
 Arnoult de Lisle, Arabist and physician
 Pierre-Louis Lions, mathematician; Fields Medalist 1994
 Edmond Locard, pioneer of forensic science
 André Lwoff, biologist, Nobel prize winner 1965
 Jean-Michel Macron, neurologist
 Charles Madic, radiochemist
 Jean-Jacques d'Ortous de Mairan,  geophysicist, astronomer and chronobiologist
 Benoit Mandelbrot, mathematician
 Jacques Masquelier, phytochemist
 Albert Mathiez, historian
 Pierre Louis Maupertuis, mathematician and  philosopher
 Prosper Ménière, doctor concerned with hearing loss and tinnitus
 Marin Mersenne, mathematician
 André Michaux, botanist and explorer
 François André Michaux, botanist
 Jean-Louis Michel, oceanographer and engineer
 Jules Michelet, historian
 Alphonse Milne-Edwards, mammalologist and  ornithologist
 Abraham de Moivre, mathematician
 Jacques Monod, biologist, Nobel prize winner 1965
 Théodore Monod, naturalist and theologian
 Gabriel Mouton, mathematician  and astronomer

N–Z

 Adolphe-Simon Neboux, surgeon and naturalist
 Louis Néel, physicist, Nobel Prize winner 1970
 André Niederlender, archaeologist
 Jean de Noailles, chemist
 Jean-Baptiste Noulet, archaeologist
 Hélène Olivier-Bourbigou, chemist and researcher
 Henri Padé, mathematician
 Paul Painlevé, mathematician
 Denis Papin, physicist, mathematician, and inventor
 Blaise Pascal, mathematician and philosopher
 Étienne Pascal, mathematician
 Louis Pasteur, microbiologist and chemist
 Jean Pecquet, psychologist
 Jean-Marie Pelt, botanist
 Jocelyne Pérard, geographer
 Jean Robert Petit, paleoclimatologist
 Alphonse Pinart, philologist
 Gilles Pisier, mathematician
 Hippolyte Pixii, inventor
 Henri Poincaré, mathematician and physicist
 Lucien Poincaré, physicist
 Siméon Poisson, mathematician and physicist
 Pierre Poivre, horticulturist and botanist
 Albéric Pont, dentist and pioneer in maxillofacial surgery
 Alberte Pullman, quantum chemist
 Bernard Pullman, quantum chemist
 Lucien Quélet, naturalist and mycologist
 Petrus Ramus, mathematician and logician
 Louis-Antoine Ranvier,  physician, pathologist, anatomist and histologist
 Didier Raoult, microbiologist and virologist
 René Antoine Ferchault de Réaumur, entomologist 
 Jean-Baptiste Robinet, naturalist
 Paul Rohmer, physician
 Michel Rolle, mathematician
 Henri Romagnesi, mycologist
 Joël de Rosnay, scientific administrator
 Jean Rostand, biologist and philosopher
 Louis Rougier, mathematician, physicist, and philosopher
 Nicolas Sarrabat, mathematician concerned with many aspects of science
 Henri Émile Sauvage, ichthyologist, paleontologist, and herpetologist
 Schlumberger brothers (Conrad Schlumberger and Marcel Schlumberger)
 Laurent Schwartz, mathematician; Fields Medalist 1950
 Géraud Sénizergues, computer scientist and 2002 Gödel Prize recipient.
 Jean-Pierre Serre, mathematician; Fields Medalist 1954
 Michel Talagrand, mathematician
 Jules Tannery, mathematician
 Auguste Ambroise Tardieu, forensic medical scientist
 Daniel Tauvry, physician
 Fabiola Terzi, physician-scientist
 Melchisédech Thévenot, inventor of the spirit level 
 Adrien-Jean-Pierre Thilorier, discovered dry ice
 Françoise Thom, historian
 René Thom, mathematician; Fields Medalist 1958
 Muriel Thomasset physicist
 Pierre-Marie-Jérôme Trésaguet, engineer and road builder
 François Trèves, mathematician
 Georges Valiron, mathematician
 Jean-Pierre Vernant, historian
 Jean-Christophe Victor, geographer
 Paul-Émile Victor, ethnologist
 François Viète, mathematician
 Louis Jean Pierre Vieillot, ornithologist
 Charles Athanase Walckenaer, geographer
 Wendelin Werner, mathematician; Fields Medalist 2006 (German-born)
 Rachid Yazami, engineer and inventor
 Jean-Christophe Yoccoz, mathematician; Fields Medalist 1994

See also

 List of French people
 Lists of scientists

:tr:Fransız bilim adamları listesi

Scientists
French